The white-bellied thrush has been split into the following species:
 Makira thrush, Zoothera margaretae
 Guadalcanal thrush, Zoothera turipavae

Birds by common name